Dosheeza is an Urdu language Pakistani family and fictional digest/magazine publish from the Karachi, Sindh. The magazine was first published in 1982. It is a monthly digest based on fiction and women's magazine in Urdu language. It has its headquarters in Karachi.

See also
 List of magazines in Pakistan

References

External links
 title of March 2011

1982 establishments in Pakistan
Fiction magazines
Magazines established in 1982
Mass media in Karachi
Monthly magazines published in Pakistan
Women's magazines published in Pakistan
Urdu-language magazines